Wiley Smith Scribner (September 6, 1840 – September 28, 1889) was an American politician and acting governor of Montana Territory from 1869 to 1870.

Born in Jacksonville, Illinois, Scribner grew up in Fair Play, Grant County, Wisconsin, where he became postmaster and was a merchant. He later studied law and was admitted to the bar. A Republican, Scribner served in the 16th Wisconsin Volunteer Infantry Regiment during the American Civil War. In 1866, he was elected to the Wisconsin State Assembly. He later moved to Montana Territory, where he became a newspaper editor for the Helena Herald and eventually became territorial secretary. From 1869 to 1870 he was the territory's acting governor. He married Mary L. Reynolds in 1870. In 1872 he returned to Wisconsin, and then in 1873 he moved to Chicago, Illinois, where he practiced law and became clerk of the probate court.  In 1884, Scribner was elected recorder of deeds for Cook County, Illinois serving until his death.

Scribner died in Chicago on September 29, 1889. He was buried at Forest Hill Cemetery in Madison, Wisconsin.

References

External links
 

Politicians from Jacksonville, Illinois
Politicians from Chicago
People from Jamestown, Wisconsin
People of Wisconsin in the American Civil War
Republican Party members of the Wisconsin State Assembly
Governors of Montana Territory
County officials in Illinois
Politicians from Cook County, Illinois
1840 births
1889 deaths
Montana Republicans
Illinois Republicans
19th-century American politicians
Lawyers from Chicago
Wisconsin lawyers
Wisconsin postmasters
19th-century American lawyers